Novi Sanzhary is an urban-type settlement, located in Poltava Raion of Poltava Oblast in central Ukraine, but was formerly the administrative center of Novi Sanzhary Raion before its abolition. Population:

History 
On 20 February 2020, the Ukrainian evacuees from China due to the COVID-19 pandemic were taken to Novi Sanzhary. They were met by protesters blocking the buses, throwing stones and engaging in violent clashes with the police.

9 policemen and one civilian were injured.

Later, Minister of Healthcare of Ukraine Zoriana Skaletska promised to join those in quarantine for 14 days.

References

Urban-type settlements in Poltava Raion
Kobelyaksky Uyezd
Populated places established in 1925